Dean Goodhill (October 23, 1944) is an American film editor who was nominated at the 66th Academy Awards for Best Film Editing for the film The Fugitive. He shared the nomination with Don Brochu, David Finfer, Dov Hoenig, Richard Nord and Dennis Virkler.

Selected filmography
Blood and Bone (2009)
The Lightkeepers (2009)
My Sexiest Year (2007)
Curse of the Starving Class (1994)
The Fugitive (1993)
Knights (1993)
When the Party's Over (1993) 
All I Want for Christmas (1991)
Freeway Maniac (1989)
Wild Zone (1989)
Mercenary Fighters (1988)
Terminal Entry (1988)
The Women's Club (1987)

References

External links
 

American film editors
Living people
1944 births
People from Los Angeles